Emily Mary Barton (1817–1909) was an English-born Australian poet. She wrote poetry for most of her life, and was still publishing when she was 90. She was the grandmother of Andrew Barton (Banjo) Paterson.

Early life and education
Emily Mary Darvall was born on 3 December 1817 in England. Her parents were Major Edward Darvall and Emily Darvall née Johnson. She was the eldest daughter of the Darvall's seven children, and the fourth child. In 1839, Major Darvall and five of his children set off for the colony of New South Wales, his second son John Bayley Darvall having travelled to New South Wales five months earlier.

Barton had a classical education, having spent some of her early life in Belgium and France.

Career
In 1840, Emily married Robert Johnstone Barton, a son of Lt. General Charles Barton. Her husband was a retired naval officer turned grazier, and they met on the voyage to Australia, aboard the Alfred. They had eight children. He died on 4 October 1863 at the Australian Club in Sydney, aged 54. The Bartons' elder daughters, Emily and Rose, married the brothers John and Andrew Paterson.

Her letters to her family and friends often contained verses, and she contributed to the entertainment on board during the trip to Australia with poems and verses.

Barton died at her home, "Rock End", Gladesville, New South Wales, on 24 August 1909. Following a funeral service at Christ Church, Gladesville, her remains were interred at St. Anne's Cemetery, Ryde.

Selected works
A Few of Granmamma's Prizes for the Little Ones. Sydney Gibbs, Shallard and Co., 1885
 Straws on the Stream. Sydney [The Author] 1907
 Straws on the Stream. Sydney W. E. Smith 1910. This collection, with the same name as the earlier, self-published edition, was published post-humously.

References

Further reading
Long, Jeremy (1994). Strugglers and settlers: Darvall family letters 1839–1949. Springwood, NSW. Butterfly Books. 

1817 births
1909 deaths
19th-century Australian women writers
19th-century Australian poets
Australian women poets
English emigrants to colonial Australia
Poets from Sydney